"The Great Summons" or "Da Zhao" 
is one of the poems anthologized in the ancient Chinese poetry collection, the Chu ci, also known as The Songs of the South. "The Great Summons" consists of a single poem without introduction or epilog. Its authorship has been attributed to Qu Yuan and to the otherwise relatively unknown Jing Cuo. (Hawkes, 2011 [1985]: 232-233) It is very similar, but shorter, than another of the Chu ci poems, Zhao Hun, ("Summons of the Soul"). Both poems derive from a shamanic tradition of summoning the soul of the someone who has seemed to die, most likely originally with the intention of having it to re-animate its former body (but in the later literary tradition this was meant more allegorically). The two poems both follow a similar pattern: threats of dangers lurking in all directions to which the soul might wander and then tempting descriptions of magnificent sensual pleasures which would be available as a reward for the souls obedient return. (Hawkes, 2011 [1985]: 219-221)

Interpretations
Various interpretations of "The Great Summons" have been made, as to whose soul is being summoned, by whom, and in what context. According to a historically unlikely tradition, Qu Yuan was on the verge of suicide for political reasons, and wrote "The Great Summons" to persuade himself to cling to life.

Selection from "The Great Summons"
In the "Great Summons", food is described with a rhapsodic and worldly joy. "The Great Summons" describes a sumptuous feast, designed to tempt a fleeing soul back to the body when it is on the point of fleeing away permanently:

See also
Chu (state)
Chuci
List of Chuci contents
Qu Yuan
大招 (Wikisource, in Chinese)

External links
MORE TRANSLATIONS FROM THE CHINESE, by Arthur Waley

Notes

References
Hawkes, David, translator and introduction (2011 [1985]). Qu Yuan et al., The Songs of the South: An Ancient Chinese Anthology of Poems by Qu Yuan and Other Poets. London: Penguin Books. 
Qu Yuan, translation by Arthur Waley, from MORE TRANSLATIONS FROM THE CHINESE, Alfred E. Knopf, 1919.

Chinese poems